Neiman Marcus Group, Inc. is an American integrated luxury retailer headquartered in Dallas, Texas, which owns Neiman Marcus, Bergdorf Goodman, Horchow, and Last Call. Since September 2021, NMG has been owned by a group of investment companies led by Davidson Kempner Capital Management, Sixth Street Partners and Pacific Investment Management.

History

1907–1949 
Herbert Marcus Sr., a former buyer with Dallas' Sanger Brothers department store, had left his previous job to found a new business with his sister Carrie Marcus Neiman and her husband, Abraham Lincoln Neiman, then employees of Sanger Brothers competitor A. Harris and Co. In 1907, the trio had  from the successful sales-promotion firm they had built in Atlanta, Georgia, and two potential investments of funds. Rather than take a chance on an unknown "sugary soda pop business," the three entrepreneurs rejected the fledgling Coca-Cola company and chose instead to return to Dallas to establish a retail business. For this reason, early company CEO Peb Atera was quoted in 1957 as saying in jest that Neiman Marcus was "founded on bad business judgment." The store, established on September 10, 1907, was lavishly furnished and stocked with clothing of a quality not commonly found in Texas. Within a few weeks, the store's initial inventory, mostly acquired on a buying trip to New York made by Carrie, was completely sold out. Oil-rich Texans, welcoming the opportunity to flaunt their wealth in more sophisticated fashion than was previously possible, flocked to the new store. In spite of the Panic of 1907 set off only a few weeks after its opening, Neiman Marcus was instantly successful, and its first several years of operation were quite profitable.

In 1914, a fire destroyed the Neiman Marcus store and all of its merchandise. A temporary store was opened for 17 days. By the end of 1914, Neiman Marcus opened its new, permanent location at the corner of Main Street and Ervay Street. With the opening of the flagship Neiman Marcus Building, the store increased its product selection to include accessories, lingerie, and children's clothing, as well as expanding the women's apparel department. In its first year at the new building, Neiman Marcus recorded a profit of $40,000 on sales of $700,000, nearly twice the totals reached in its last year at the original location.

In 1927, the store expanded, and Neiman Marcus premiered the first weekly retail fashion show in the United States. The store staged a show called "One Hundred Years of Texas Fashions" in 1936 in honor of the centennial of Texas's independence from Mexico. A later profile of the store, "Neiman Marcus of Texas", described the "grandiose and elaborate" gala, noting: "It was on this occasion that one of the most critical among the store's guests, Mrs. Edna Woolman Chase, editor of Vogue, expressing the sentiment of the store's starry-eyed clientele, told the local press:

In 1929, the store began offering menswear. During the 1930s and 1940s, Neiman Marcus began to include less-expensive clothing lines along with its high-end items, in response to the Great Depression and following war years. Between 1942 and 1944, sales at Neiman Marcus grew from $6 million to $11 million. Despite a major fire in 1946, the store continued to profit.

1950–1999
Herbert Marcus Sr. died in 1950, and Carrie Neiman died two years later, leaving Stanley Marcus in charge of the company's operations.

The 1950s saw the addition of a $1.6 million store at 8300 Preston Road (in the Preston Center; the location currently occupied by the Tootsies store). It was a  store "inspired by the art and culture of Southwestern Indians" and "colors ... copied from Indian weaving, pottery, and sand paintings". The themed decor included Kachina figures on colored-glass murals and an Alexander Calder mobile named "Mariposa," the Spanish word for butterfly. Art likewise was used as inspiration for Stanley Marcus' seasonal campaigns to solicit new colors in fabrics, as he did the year that he borrowed 20 Paul Gauguin paintings — many of which had never been publicly exhibited — from collectors around the world and had the vivid colors translated into dyes for wool, silk, and leather. Area teachers cited the Gauguin exhibits as spurring a dramatic increase in art study.

In the 1950s and 1960s, Gittings operated a portrait studio in Neiman Marcus. Clients included Hope Portocarrero, Lyndon Johnson, Howard Hughes, and the Shah of Iran, Mohammad Reza Pahlavi and his family. A late 1960s Christmas Book featured portraits of Wyatt Cooper, his wife Gloria Vanderbilt, and children Carter and Anderson Cooper.

The company continued its extravagant marketing efforts (including the launch of His and Her gifts in the famous Christmas Book) with the inauguration of Fortnight in 1957. The Fortnight was an annual presentation of fashions and culture from a particular country, held in late October and early November of each year, and was one of the most anticipated events in Dallas. It brought fashion, dignitaries, celebrities, exotic food and extravagant celebrations to the downtown store for 29 years.

Neiman Marcus opened its first store outside the Dallas/Fort Worth Metroplex in downtown Houston in 1957. The freestanding store was later replaced with a new anchor store located in the Houston Galleria in 1970. In 1965 the Preston Center store was closed and a new store, more than twice as big, was opened at NorthPark Center. Another branch in Fort Worth was also opened. By 1967 the four Neiman Marcus stores in operation were generating annual sales of $58.5 million, and the company's profit for that year was in excess of $2 million.  In 1968, the company merged with Broadway-Hale Stores, Inc., which enabled Neiman Marcus to expand at a much faster pace than would have been possible as an independent entity. In 1971, the first Neiman Marcus outside Texas opened in Bal Harbour, Florida. In subsequent years stores opened in over 30 cities across the United States, including Atlanta, Charlotte, Beverly Hills, Boston, Chicago, Las Vegas, Minneapolis, San Francisco and St. Louis. Neiman Marcus also had a letter of intent to open a 120,000 square foot store in downtown Cleveland in 1992 as part of an anchor for the upscale Tower City Center. However, the project did not come to fruition, instead opening its concept store in the 1990s. In 1987 Bergdorf Goodman was acquired by the Neiman Marcus Group. In 1988 the brand's name was officially changed from Neiman-Marcus to Neiman Marcus, and the current logo was adopted.

2000–2010
Stanley Marcus died on January 22, 2002. He had served as president and chairman of the board for the company.  Marcus had been the architect behind the fashion shows, New York advertising for a strictly regional chain, in-store art exhibits, and the Christmas catalog with its outlandish His-and-Hers gifts, including vicuña wool coats, a pair of airplanes, "Noah's Ark" (including pairs of animals), camels, and live tigers.

Over the last 20 years, ownership of Neiman Marcus has passed through several hands. In June 1987, the company was spun off from its retail parent, Carter Hawley Hale Stores, and became a publicly listed company. General Cinema, later to become Harcourt General, still had a roughly 60% controlling interest until 1999, when Neiman Marcus was fully spun off from its parent company. On May 2, 2005, Neiman Marcus Group was the subject of a leveraged buyout (LBO), selling itself to two private equity firms, Texas Pacific Group and Warburg Pincus.

The "Neiman-Marcus Collection," comprising early account books, advertising and Christmas Catalog layouts, files on charity activities, past awards and presentations, and a collection of Stanley Marcus's personal memorabilia, among many other items, is located in the Texas & Dallas History & Archives Division, 7th Floor, Main Library, Dallas Public Library, where it may be consulted by researchers.

2010–2019 
In August 2013, Women's Wear Daily reported Neiman Marcus Group was preparing for an initial public offering of its stock. In October 2013, the Neiman Marcus Group was sold for $6 billion to Ares Management and the Canada Pension Plan Investment Board. In August 2015, the company again announced it was preparing for an initial public offering. In late 2015 Neiman Marcus became a stand-alone company.

In November 2013 the firm discovered a 25-carat rough diamond off Namibia's coast, which was valued with a reserve price tag of $1.85 million. The diamond was referred to as the "Nam Diamond".

In 2018 Geoffroy van Raemdonck replaced Karen Katz as CEO.

In April 2019, Neiman Marcus acquired a minority stake in Fashionphile, an online resale platform for handbags, jewelry and accessories.

2020–present
Neiman Marcus Group, Ltd. LLC and 23 affiliated debtors filed Chapter 11 bankruptcy in the United States District Court for the Southern District of Texas in May 2020. The debtors requested joint administration of the cases under Case No. 20-32519.  According to the company's CEO, Geoffroy van Raemdonck, the filing was a direct result of the COVID-19 pandemic in the United States. The company's website, mytheresa.com, was not part of the bankruptcy.
At the end of September 2020, Neiman Marcus exited Chapter 11 bankruptcy, and as of 2022 is owned by a consortium of investment firms (Davidson Kempner Capital Management, Sixth Street Partners and Pacific Investment Management).

In June 2022 NMG reported their highest sales volume in almost half of their stores, and sales of their 20 best-selling brands grew by 70% above pre-COVID levels in 2019. The company has also been attracting younger customers, with the average age falling by seven years from pre-pandemic levels, from the mid-40s to the high-30s.

Corporate affairs

Neiman Marcus is still in operation today under the original name and is still headquartered in Dallas, where it was founded. The Neiman Marcus Group comprises the Specialty Retail stores division including Neiman Marcus Stores and Bergdorf Goodman. These retailers offer luxury apparel, accessories, jewelry, beauty and decorative home products. As of mid-2022 the company operates 36 Neiman Marcus stores in the United States and two Bergdorf Goodman stores in Manhattan. Neiman Marcus' largest market is the South Florida MSA, where they operate five stores. The company also operates five "Last Call" clearance centers and  the online luxury furniture outlet Horchow.com." 

The Neiman Marcus Group owned majority interest in Kate Spade LLC, a manufacturer of handbags and accessories. In October 2006, the company purchased all minority interest for approximately $59.4 million, and in November 2006 sold 100% ownership to Liz Claiborne, Inc. for approximately $121.5 million. Another divestiture was a majority interest in Gurwitch Products LLC, which manufactures Laura Mercier cosmetics, to Alticor Inc., for approximately $40.8 million.

In 2013, Neiman Marcus settled a federal claim for falsely claiming that some of their products contained fake fur when tests by the Humane Society of the United States showed it was actually real fur from raccoon dogs. Neiman Marcus did not admit guilt, but promised to adhere to federal fur labeling laws (the Fur Act) for the next twenty years.

In 2014 Neiman Marcus acquired German luxury fashion e-commerce platform mytheresa.com and its flagship store Theresa from its founders Christoph and Susanne Botschen and venture capital firm Acton Capital Partners. The luxury fashion online store ships worldwide and offers designer clothing, shoes, bags and accessories for women.

In 2019, Neiman Marcus creditor, Marble Ridge Capital, had a lawsuit against Neiman Marcus dismissed after the claim of inappropriate transfer of the company's MyTheresa assets was dismissed by a Texas judge due to lack of subject-matter jurisdiction.

In March 2020, NMG launched an app called NM CONNECT, which allows salespeople to communicate directly with customers via texts, email, phone and video calls.  

In June 2021, NMG acquired Stylyze, an e-commerce platform, to expand the company's e-commerce capabilities. Users connect to NMG using the proprietary app CONNECT.  

In April 2022, Farfetch Limited agreed to a $200 million minority investment in the Neiman Marcus Group, aiming to stimulate growth through the stores' use of Farfetch's "Platform Solutions" e-commerce marketplace.

The Christmas Book

"His and Hers" and "Fantasy" gifts

Since 1939, Neiman Marcus has issued an annual Christmas catalog, which gets much free publicity from the national media for a tradition of unusual and extravagant gifts not sold in its stores. Some have included the "his and hers" themed items, trips and cars (see below).

In 1952, Stanley Marcus introduced a new tradition of having extravagant and unusual gifts in each year's Christmas catalog, The Christmas Book. The idea was sparked when journalist Edward R. Murrow contacted Marcus to ask if the store would be offering anything unusual that might interest his radio listeners. Marcus invented on the spot an offering of a live Black Angus bull accompanied by a sterling silver barbecue cart, and the catalog was subsequently altered to include this item, priced at $1,925. At one point, the Neiman Marcus Christmas catalog carried the distinction of being the item most stolen from recipients' mailboxes, prompting a Chicago postmaster to suggest the company switch to enclosing the catalogs in plain brown wrappers.

Neiman's fantasy gifts in the Christmas Book have included a $20 million submarine, mummy cases that contained an actual mummy, seats from Ebbets Field, and a $1.5 million Cobalt Valkyrie-X plane; the most expensive item was a Boeing Business Jet for over $35 million.

Other Christmas gifts
In 1961, Neiman-Marcus in Dallas was one of two stores in the nation — the other being Wanamaker's in Philadelphia — to offer computer-based assistance in selecting Christmas gifts. The process worked by comparing information on the recipient to a computerized
list of the 2,200 items available at Neiman-Marcus, then providing a printout of the 10 best suggestions. One person testing the computer filled out the questionnaire as if he were President John F. Kennedy shopping for gifts in excess of $1,000 for his wife; the computer suggested a yacht.

During the Apollo 8 mission in December 1968, Marilyn Lovell, wife of astronaut Jim Lovell, who was the Command Module Pilot, received, as a Christmas present, a mink coat that was delivered to her by a Neiman Marcus driver in a Rolls-Royce car. The coat was wrapped in royal blue wrapping paper with two Styrofoam balls — one for the Earth and the other for the Moon — and had a card that read, "To Marilyn, from the Man in the Moon."

In 2012, Neiman Marcus partnered with Target Corporation to create a holiday collection featuring 24 designers from the Council of Fashion Designers of America (CFDA). The 50-piece collection featured apparel, accessories and even some gifts for dogs.

Cookie recipe urban legend
Dating back as early as the 1930s, rumors started to circulate about a woman and her daughter who were out to lunch and for dessert shared a chocolate chip cookie that they loved so much they asked the server for the recipe. The server said that the recipe would cost "two fifty" and the woman agreed. However, she was in disbelief when she was charged $250 for the recipe instead of what she thought would be $2.50. The rumor eventually became xeroxlore and a chain letter. 

In 1997, after the rumor had progressed to an infamous e-mail forward, the company released a statement that the story was an urban legend. As a sign of good faith, the store also released a version of their cookie recipe for free to all customers to try.

References

External links

Neiman Marcus Group
The Department Store Museum: Neiman Marcus

1907 establishments in Texas
Clothing retailers of the United States
Companies based in Dallas
American companies established in 1907
Retail companies established in 1907
Department stores of the United States
Luxury brands
Privately held companies based in Texas
CPP Investment Board companies
Private equity portfolio companies
2013 mergers and acquisitions
Companies that filed for Chapter 11 bankruptcy in 2020